The 2003 CAF Cup was the 12th and final edition of the African continental club competition for runners up of the respective domestic leagues. It was won by Moroccan team Raja Casablanca who beat Cotonsport Garoua from Cameroon over two legs in the final.

In following seasons, the CAF Cup was merged with the African Cup Winners' Cup to form the CAF Confederation Cup.

First round

|}

1LISCR withdrew before the first leg and were subsequently banned for 3 years by CAF.

First Leg

Second Leg

Saint Michel United win 1-0 on aggregate

Green Buffaloes win 3-2 on aggregate

1-1 on aggregate, Black Rhinos win on away goals

Kiyovu Sport win 3-1 on aggregate

Al-Nasr win 1-0 on aggregate

0-0 on aggregate, SONACOS win 5-4 on penalties

Raja Casablanca win 7-2 on aggregate

FC 105 Libreville win 4-3 on aggregate

Club Africain win 2-1 on aggregate

Jeunesse Club d'Abidjan win 2-1 on aggregate

0-0 on aggregate, Cotonsport Garoua win 4-2 on penalties

2-2 on aggregate, Mamelodi Sundowns win 9-8 on penalties

DC Motema Pembe win 7-1 on aggregate

Second round

|}

First Leg

Second Leg

Green Buffaloes win 7-1 on aggregate

Black Rhinos win 2-1 on aggregate

1-1 on aggregate, JS Kabylie win on away goals

Al-Ahly win 4-1 on aggregate

Raja Casablanca win 7-3 on aggregate

Club Africain win 6-2 on aggregate

Cotonsport Garoua win 2-1 on aggregate

Enugu Rangers win 1-0 on aggregate

Quarter-finals

|}

Semi-finals

|}

Finals

First Leg

Second Leg

Raja Casablanca win 2-0 on aggregate

Champions

See also
2003 CAF Champions League

External links
Results at RSSSF.com

3
2003